Aechmea blanchetiana is a bromeliad typical of Atlantic Coast restingas vegetation which is an ecosystem of Atlantic Forest biome of eastern Brazil. This plant grows from the State of Bahia south to Espírito Santo. It is often grown elsewhere as an ornamental plant.

References

External links
 Aechmea blanchetiana
 Aechmea blanchetiana

blanchetiana
Flora of Brazil
Plants described in 1889
Taxa named by John Gilbert Baker
Taxa named by Lyman Bradford Smith